Maher Island is a small horseshoe-shaped island lying  north of the north-western end of Siple Island, off the coast of Marie Byrd Land, Antarctica. It is one of the three pieces of land closest to the Oceanic Pole of Inaccessibility, also known as 'Point Nemo'.  It has numerous areas of exposed rock and is mostly ice-free in summer. It is claimed to be a territory of Grand Duchy of Flandrensis.

Discovery and naming
It was discovered and photographed from aircraft of U.S. Navy Operation Highjump, 1946–47, and was named by the Advisory Committee on Antarctic Names for Commander Eugene Maher, U.S. Navy, commanding officer of  during Operation Deep Freeze, 1955–56.

Important Bird Area
An 51 ha site, comprising the whole of the island, has been designated an Important Bird Area (IBA) by BirdLife International because it supports about 10,000 breeding pairs of Adélie penguins, as estimated by 2011 satellite imagery.

See also 
 List of Antarctic and Subantarctic islands

References

 
Important Bird Areas of Antarctica
Penguin colonies
Islands of Marie Byrd Land